Vittorio Menzingher (1861-1925) was an Italian politician. He was a governor of Tripolitania (1919-1920). He was its first civil governor after a series of military ones.

Formerly, he had been an acting mayor of Pisa (1905-1907), and Naples (1913-1914).

Notes

1861 births
1925 deaths
Italian colonial governors and administrators
Barons of Italy